Below are the rosters of the teams that participated in the 2001 Copa América.

Group A

Chile
Head coach: Pedro García

Colombia
Head coach: Francisco Maturana

Ecuador
Head coach:  Hernán Darío Gómez

Venezuela
Head coach: Richard Páez

Group B

Brazil
Head coach: Luiz Felipe Scolari

Mexico
Head coach: Javier Aguirre

Paraguay
Head coach:  Sergio Markarián

Peru
Head coach: Julio César Uribe

Group C

Bolivia
Head coach: Carlos Aragonés

Costa Rica
Head coach: Alexandre Guimarães

Honduras
Head coach: Ramón Maradiaga

Uruguay
Head coach: Víctor Púa

Withdrawn teams

Argentina
Argentine squad was revealed on 16 June 2001. The team ultimately withdrew from the tournament on 10 July and were replaced by Honduras.

Head coach: Marcelo Bielsa

Canada
Canada squad was revealed on 26 June 2001. The team ultimately withdrew from the tournament on 1 July and were replaced by Costa Rica.

Head coach:  Holger Osieck

References

External links
RSSSF

2001 Copa América
2001